Prestige Diesels & Sports Limited is a UK-based used car sales company located in Portsmouth, Hampshire, England.

The company was founded in 2011 by Scott Shilcock and Alexis Cassey. They have been quoted  in the media several times regarding the Volkswagen emissions scandal including The Telegraph, BBC One news, BuzzFeed News, and ITV news.

Prestige Diesels sells various makes and models but specializes in Mercedes-Benz, BMW, Jaguar, Volvo, and MINI.

Recognition 
 Most Influential Dealer by Car Dealer magazine - 2016
 Most Influential Independent Dealer by Car Dealer magazine - 2016
 First independent car dealer in the UK to win Most Influential Dealer by Car Dealer magazine - 2015
 Winner, Best Used Car Dealer (under 50 cars) by Car Dealer magazine and celebrity Mike Brewer - 2014
 Highly Commended, Best Used Car Dealer (under 50 cars) by Car Dealer magazine and celebrity Mike Brewer - 2015

References

External links
Prestige Diesels Official site

Automotive companies established in 2011
British companies established in 2011
Automotive companies of the United Kingdom